Conqueyrac is a commune in the Gard department in southern France.

Climate
Temperatures reached 44.1 °C (111.4 °F) in Conqueyrac and Saint-Christol-lès-Alès on 12 August 2003 during the 2003 European heat wave. They were France's highest temperatures ever recorded until 28 June 2019, when temperatures reached as high as 45.9 °C (114.6 °F) in southern France.

Population

See also
Communes of the Gard department

References

Communes of Gard